Chong Wai-kin is a Hong Kong television producer and director.

He first entered Asia Television (ATV) as a director and producer for the channel's television dramas. In 1989, he moved to Television Broadcasts Limited (TVB) and has stayed in the company ever since. He is known for producing many of TVB's grand-production television dramas, such as Revelation of the Last Hero (1992), A Step into the Past (2001), and Born Rich (2009).

Filmography

As producer

References

External links
 
Chong Wai-kin at Douban

Hong Kong film directors
TVB producers
Living people
Hong Kong people
Year of birth missing (living people)